Shortell is a surname. Notable people with the surname include:

Max Shortell (born 1992), American football quarterback
Timothy Shortell, American sociologist